Jeffrey Alford is a Canadian food writer, best known for cookbooks co-written with his ex-wife Naomi Duguid.

Biography
Alford was raised in Laramie, Wyoming and he graduated from high school there in 1972.  He earned a master's degree in creative writing  at the University of Wyoming. After leaving Wyoming, he lived in Ireland and traveled the world.

He met Duguid on a bike trip in Tibet in 1985 and they were married in early 1986.  They had two sons, and lived in Toronto, Ontario, Canada. The couple separated in 2009, and Alford now lives in a small village in Northern Thailand.

Books
Flatbreads and Flavors: A Culinary Atlas (1995)
Seductions of Rice (1998)
Hot Sour Salty Sweet: A Culinary Journey Through Southeast Asia (2000)
Home Baking: Sweet and Savory Traditions from Around the World (2003)
Mangoes and Curry Leaves: Culinary Travels Through the Great Subcontinent (2005)
Beyond the Great Wall: Recipes and Travels in the Other China (2008)
Chicken in the Mango Tree: Food and Life in a Thai-Khmer Village (2015)

Notes

Further reading

External links
 Hot Sour Salty Sweet: Official website of Jeffrey Alford + Naomi Duguid

Canadian food writers
Living people
Canadian cookbook writers
James Beard Foundation Award winners
Year of birth missing (living people)